Now! Music (Volume IV) is the eighth solo album by jazz pianist Mike Garson, and was released in 2003.

Track listing

References

External links
 Now Music Vol.4 at CD-Baby Album track listing and reviews
 mikegarson.com Official Website with Discography

Mike Garson albums
2003 albums
Jazz fusion albums by American artists